The 1832 United States presidential election in New York took place between November 2 and December 5, 1832, as part of the 1832 United States presidential election. Voters chose 42 representatives, or electors to the Electoral College, who voted for President and Vice President.

New York voted for the Democratic Party candidate, Andrew Jackson, over the National Republican candidate, Henry Clay. Jackson won New York by a narrow margin of 4.2%.

Results

See also
 United States presidential elections in New York

References

New York
1832
1832 New York (state) elections